De Valera is a surname of Spanish origin that may refer to:

Cipriano de Valera (1531–1602), Spanish Protestant refugee
Diego de Valera (1412–1488), Spanish writer
Éamon de Valera (1882–1975), American-born Irish statesman
Máirin de Valéra, (1912–1984), Irish phycologist
Rúaidhrí de Valera (1916–1978), Irish archaeologist
Síle de Valera (1954–), Irish Fianna Fáil politician
Sinéad de Valera (1878–1975), wife of Éamon de Valera
Vivion de Valera (1910–1982), Irish Fianna Fáil politician

See also
De Valera's Cottage, childhood home of Éamon de Valera
Éamon de Valera Forest, planted in his honour in Israel

Spanish-language surnames
De Valera family